was a daimyō during Bakumatsu period Japan, who served as chief senior councilor (Rōjū) in service to the Tokugawa shogunate.

Biography
Mizuno Tadakiyo was the eldest son of Mizuno Tadakuni, the daimyō of Hamamatsu Domain and chief senior councilor (Rōjū) in service to the Tokugawa shogunate. After the failure of the Tenpō Reforms, Tadakuni was forced into retirement and exile, and turned the leadership of the Mizuno clan and the position of daimyō of Hamamatsu Domain to Tadakiyo in 1845.

However, the same year, Tadakuni was reassigned to Yamagata Domain (50,000 koku) in Dewa Province. After the pardon of his father in 1851, Tadakuni’s fortunes improved.  Within the shogunal administration, he received the post of Jisha-bugyō (Commissioner of Shrine and Temples) and wakadoshiyori (Junior Councilor). In 1862, he became a Rōjū in the service of Shōgun Tokugawa Iemochi.

As Rōjū, he worked with Oguri Tadamasa in the construction of Yokosuka Naval Arsenal as part of the Tokugawa shogunate’s efforts to modernize Japan’s military.

He retired from public life in 1866 on the death of Shōgun Tokugawa Iemochi, and was succeeded at Yamagata by his son Mizuno Tadahiro. Mizuno Tadakiyo was married to a daughter of Inoue Masahari, a fellow Rōjū and daimyō of Tanagura Domain.

References 
 Papinot, Edmond. (1906) Dictionnaire d'histoire et de géographie du japon. Tokyo: Librarie Sansaisha...Click link for digitized 1906 Nobiliaire du japon (2003)
 The content of much of this article was derived from that of the corresponding article on Japanese Wikipedia.

1833 births
1884 deaths
Rōjū
Fudai daimyo
Wakadoshiyori
Meiji Restoration
Mizuno clan